Camp Ripley Bridge, also known as Bridge 4969, is the only remaining unified road–rail bridge over the Mississippi River. It carries both a railroad spur line and Minnesota State Highway 115 at Camp Ripley in Morrison County.

It was built in 1930 by the Minneapolis Bridge Company to serve as the key transportation connection for Camp Ripley, the state's first and most significant Minnesota National Guard reservation.  As Minnesota's only unified road–rail bridge, it was added to the National Register of Historic Places in 2015.

See also
 List of bridges on the National Register of Historic Places in Minnesota
 List of crossings of the Upper Mississippi River
 National Register of Historic Places listings in Morrison County, Minnesota

References

External links
 Camp Ripley Bridge (Bridge 4969)–Minnesota Department of Transportation

1930 establishments in Minnesota
Bridges completed in 1930
Bridges over the Mississippi River
National Register of Historic Places in Morrison County, Minnesota
Railroad bridges on the National Register of Historic Places in Minnesota
Road bridges on the National Register of Historic Places in Minnesota
Road-rail bridges in the United States
Transportation in Morrison County, Minnesota
Metal bridges in the United States
Buildings and structures in Morrison County, Minnesota